The Svetlyak class, Russian designation Project 10410 Svetlyak, is a class of patrol boats designed and built in the Soviet Union and later in Russia, and currently being used primarily by the Russian Navy and Russian Coast Guard.

Design

The patrol boats of the class are designed to carry out a variety of missions, from patrol missions to prevent violations of maritime state border, to protect friendly vessels and facilities from enemy surface and air attacks. The patrol boats are constructed with a steel hull and aluminum superstructure. The boats have NBC warfare protection and can survive with two compartments flooded. The patrol boats engine room is coated with a vibration damping material.

Variants
 Project 10410 – a version operated by Soviet and later Russian Coast Guard.
 Project 10411 – an export missile boat version armed with eight Kh-35 (SS-N-25 'Switchblade') anti-ship missiles.
 Project 10412 – an export version for Slovenia and Vietnam.

Operators

 Russian Navy
 Russian Coast Guard

 Slovenian Navy  

 Vietnam People's Navy

See also
 List of ships of the Soviet Navy
 List of ships of Russia by project number

References

Notes

Bibliography
  Also published as

External links
 Project 10410 at RussianShips
 Project 10410 general characteristics
 Maritime Units of the Russian Border Guard Forces
 

Patrol vessels of the Soviet Navy
Patrol vessels of the Russian Navy
 
Patrol boat classes